Hymenocephalus is the scientific name of two genera of organisms and may refer to:

Hymenocephalus (fish), a genus of fishes in the family Macrouridae
Hymenocephalus (plant), a genus of plants in the family Asteraceae